The 2004 WTA Tour Championships was a women's round robin tennis tournament played on indoor hard courts at the Staples Center in Los Angeles, United States. It was the 34th edition of the year-end singles championships, the 29th edition of the year-end doubles championships, and was part of the 2004 WTA Tour. The tournament was held between November 10 and November 15, 2004. Sixth-seeded Maria Sharapova won the singles event, the first, and so far only, Russian to win the tournament, and earned $1,000,000 first-prize money as well as 485 ranking points.

Justine Henin-Hardenne had qualified for the tournament but withdrew due to illness (cytomegalovirus).

Finals

Singles

 Maria Sharapova defeated  Serena Williams, 4–6, 6–2, 6–4.

Doubles

 Nadia Petrova /  Meghann Shaughnessy defeated  Cara Black /  Rennae Stubbs, 7–5, 6–2.

References

External links
 
 WTA Championships draws (PDF)

WTA Tour Championships
WTA Tour Championships
WTA Tour Championships
WTA Tour Championships
WTA Tour Championships
WTA Tour Championships
Sports competitions in Los Angeles
Tennis in Los Angeles
Tennis tournaments in California